Ponderosa is a census-designated place (CDP) in Tulare County, California. The 2010 United States census reported Ponderosa's population was 16. Ponderosa can be reached from Porterville by 43 curvy miles on a combination of California State Route 190 and the county-maintained Western Divide Highway with an elevation gain of 6,772 feet.

Geography
According to the United States Census Bureau, the CDP covers an area of 0.8 square miles (2.1 km), 99.84% of it land and 0.16% of it water.

Demographics
At the 2010 census Ponderosa had a population of 16. The population density was 19.7 people per square mile (7.6/km). The racial makeup of Ponderosa was 13 (81.3%) White, 0 (0.0%) African American, 0 (0.0%) Native American, 0 (0.0%) Asian, 0 (0.0%) Pacific Islander, 1 (6.3%) from other races, and 2 (12.5%) from two or more races.  Hispanic or Latino of any race were 4 people (25.0%).

The whole population lived in households, no one lived in non-institutionalized group quarters and no one was institutionalized.

There were 9 households, 1 (11.1%) had children under the age of 18 living in them, 5 (55.6%) were opposite-sex married couples living together, 0 (0%) had a female householder with no husband present, 0 (0%) had a male householder with no wife present.  There were 0 (0%) unmarried opposite-sex partnerships, and 0 (0%) same-sex married couples or partnerships. 4 households (44.4%) were one person and 4 (44.4%) had someone living alone who was 65 or older. The average household size was 1.78.  There were 5 families (55.6% of households); the average family size was 2.40.

The age distribution was 2 people (12.5%) under the age of 18, 0 people (0%) aged 18 to 24, 2 people (12.5%) aged 25 to 44, 3 people (18.8%) aged 45 to 64, and 9 people (56.3%) who were 65 or older.  The median age was 65.3 years. For every 100 females, there were 100.0 males.  For every 100 females age 18 and over, there were 100.0 males.

There were 126 housing units at an average density of 154.8 per square mile, of the occupied units 8 (88.9%) were owner-occupied and 1 (11.1%) were rented. The homeowner vacancy rate was 11.1%; the rental vacancy rate was 0%.  12 people (75.0% of the population) lived in owner-occupied housing units and 4 people (25.0%) lived in rental housing units.

History
Ponderosa started as sheep pasture covering more than 280 acres originally owned by Alex Kramer. Over the years, his heirs sold parts of the property. One-third of the land was eventually sold to Don Carter, a real estate developer. In 1963, he subdivided his portion of the land and officially opened Ponderosa. In September, 2020, Ponderosa was spared the destruction of other small communities in the area by the naturally sparked Sequoia Complex Fire (SQF Complex)

References

Census-designated places in Tulare County, California
Populated places in the Sierra Nevada (United States)